The 2016 Dutch TT was the eighth round of the 2016 MotoGP season. It was held at the TT Circuit Assen in Assen on 26 June 2016.

Race report

MotoGP
It was the first Dutch TT held on Sunday, instead of the traditional Saturday date for the race. Geert Timmer chicane was altered removing the artificial turf and replacing it with higher kerbing. This race marked the first MotoGP class race since the 2006 Portuguese Grand Prix won by a non-factory team and the first race since the 2013 Americas Grand Prix in which all classes won by a new winner. Yamaha's podium streak record was ended for the first time since 2014 Dutch TT. It was also the 250th MotoGP race.

Moto2
Nakagami's win in Moto2 was the first for a Japanese rider in any GP class since Yuki Takahashi in the 2010 Catalan Grand Prix.

Classification

MotoGP
The race, scheduled to be run for 26 laps, was red-flagged after 14 full laps due to heavy rain and was later restarted over 12 laps. The race resulted in Jack Miller winning his maiden premier class victory. In the second part of the race, Valentino Rossi led and was pulling away before crashing out on the back end of the circuit. This in turn allowed Marc Márquez to make major championship gains by acquiring 20 points for finishing second behind Miller. This was a major turning point in the championship as Márquez would go on to claim his third title. Reigning champion Jorge Lorenzo's title defense derailed further following his Barcelona crash, as he struggled in the harsh conditions and ended up in 10th. Lorenzo remained ahead of Rossi in the standings, but slipped further behind Márquez. Scott Redding completed the podium in a rare double-rostrum for privateer teams.

Moto2
The race, scheduled to be run for 24 laps, was stopped early due to rain.

Moto3
Jorge Martín was replaced by Albert Arenas after the two Friday practice sessions.

Championship standings after the race (MotoGP)
Below are the standings for the top five riders and constructors after round eight has concluded.

Riders' Championship standings

Constructors' Championship standings

 Note: Only the top five positions are included for both sets of standings.

Notes

References

Dutch
TT
Dutch TT
Dutch